Jessica Yamada (born 13 October 1989) is a Brazilian table tennis player. She competed in the 2020 Summer Olympics.

References

1989 births
Living people
Sportspeople from São Paulo
Table tennis players at the 2020 Summer Olympics
Brazilian female table tennis players
Olympic table tennis players of Brazil
Pan American Games silver medalists for Brazil
Pan American Games bronze medalists for Brazil
Table tennis players at the 2019 Pan American Games
Pan American Games medalists in table tennis
Medalists at the 2019 Pan American Games

Brazilian people of Japanese descent
21st-century Brazilian women